Certosa is an Italian word meaning Carthusian monastery, or charterhouse. It may refer to:
 Certosa di Bologna, a former monastery which was turned into a monumental cemetery
 Certosa di Farneta, near Lucca in Tuscany
 Certosa di Ferrara
 Certosa del Galluzzo, near Florence in Tuscany
 Certosa di Padula, near Salerno in southern Italy
Certosa di Parma
 Certosa di Pavia
 Certosa di Pavia (comune), a small town in Lombardy near to, and named after the monastery
 Certosa di San Martino, a former monastery complex, now a museum, in Naples
 La Certosa, an island near Venice

See also
 Charterhouse (monastery)
List of Carthusian monasteries